The following is a list of events relating to television in Ireland from 1970.

Events

21 March – Ireland wins the Eurovision Song Contest, held in Amsterdam, for the first time with All Kinds of Everything sung by Dana.
May – Finnish Television airs a four-hour broadcast of RTÉ programmes titled Ireland Tonight. The broadcast includes King of the Road, a film of the life of a Tipperary roadworker, the children's series Wanderly Wagon, Guests of the Nation, a dramatisation of Frank O'Connor's short story; Ballad Sheet, July the Mad Month, a film on the political and religious situation in Northern Ireland, and Sports Magazine.
6 May – RTÉ broadcasts seven hours of news coverage on the dismissal of cabinet members by the Taoiseach.
9 May – Gerry Collins is appointed Minister for Posts and Telegraphs.
Undated – As the situation in Northern Ireland intensifies, RTÉ's coverage of events increases, with frequent extended news bulletins and additional news programming.
Undated – The limit on the number of households connected to high-specification television aerial is raised to 500.

Debuts
29 September –  H.R. Pufnstuf (1969)

Ongoing television programmes
RTÉ News: Nine O'Clock (1961–present)
RTÉ News: Six One (1962–present)
The Late Late Show (1962–present)
Newsbeat (1964–1971)
The Riordans (1965–1979)
Quicksilver (1965–1981)
Seven Days (1966–1976)
Wanderly Wagon (1967–1982)

Births
8 July – Maura Derrane, journalist and television presenter
17 December – Craig Doyle, radio and television presenter
Undated – Alan Devine, actor

See also

1970 in Ireland

References

 
1970s in Irish television